The Rochester Knighthawks were a lacrosse team based in Rochester, New York, that played in the National Lacrosse League (NLL). The 2018 season was the 24th in franchise history.

Regular season

Final standings

Game log

Playoffs

Roster

Entry Draft
The 2017 NLL Entry Draft took place on September 18, 2017. The Knighthawks made the following selections:

See also
2018 NLL season

References

Rochester Knighthawks seasons
Rochester
Rochester Knighthawks